Juha Mannerkorpi (1915, Ashtabula, Ohio - 1980) was a Finnish writer and recipient of the Eino Leino Prize in 1961.

References

1915 births
1980 deaths
People from Ashtabula, Ohio
Finnish writers
Recipients of the Eino Leino Prize